The Parti rouge (French for "Red Party", or , "Democratic Party") was a political group that contested elections in the Eastern section of the Province of Canada. It was formed around 1847 by radical French-Canadians inspired by the ideas of Louis-Joseph Papineau, the Institut canadien de Montréal, and the reformist movement led by the Parti patriote of the 1830s.

The Red Party did not experience electoral success in the same manner as the Blue Party, their electoral rivals in Canada East. Because of their anti-clerical beliefs, the Red Party was condemned by the Catholic Church, contributing to their lack of electoral success. The party did form government as part of a coalition with the Clear Grits and Liberals from Canada West on some occasions before confederation, but never held a majority in their section of the province.  After confederation, the party was dissolved, with members forming the Liberal Party of Canada at the federal level, and the Liberal Party of Quebec at the provincial level.

History
The party was a successor to the Parti patriote, a radical political movement in Lower Canada responsible for the rebellions of 1837–1838. The reformist rouges did not believe that the 1840 Act of Union had truly granted a responsible government to former Upper and Lower Canada. They advocated important democratic reforms, republicanism, and secularism (separation of the state and the church). They were perceived as anti-clerical and radical by their political adversaries. Some of its members desired the abolition of the semi-feudal seigneurial system of land ownership, although Papineau was himself a seigneur and a vocal defender of the traditional system, which he wanted reformed, not abolished.

The elected rouges typically allied with the Clear Grits in the legislature of the Province of Canada. The party primarily sat in opposition to the Liberal-Conservative-Bleu government that governed the province for most of the period between the fall of the reform movement and confederation. However, the rouges did form government with the Clear Grits once, after the fall of the Macdonald-Cartier ministry on a vote of non-confidence. This resulted in the shortest-lived government in Canadian history, falling four days after it was called by the Governor-General. After Confederation, its more moderate members (notably including Sir Wilfrid Laurier, who would become Canada's first francophone Prime Minister) formed what became the Liberal Party of Canada in conjunction with their Upper Canadian Clear Grit allies.

Ideology 
The Parti rouge opposed the union of Upper Canada and Lower Canada into the United Province of Canada, and demanded its termination. When talks for Canadian confederation began, its members either opposed the idea, or suggested a decentralized confederation. Some elements of the party advocated for full sovereignty, or joining with the United States, for the French-speaking part of Canada. They were opposed to the ultramontane politics of the Catholic clergy of Quebec and the Parti bleu.

Manifestos 
The Red Party published the following manifestos:
 Manifeste du Comité constitutionnel de la réforme et du progrès, 1847 (online)
 Manifeste du Club national démocratique, 1849 (online)

See also

Canada
Contributions to liberal theory
Institut canadien de Montréal
Liberal democracy
Liberalism
Liberalism in Canada
Liberalism worldwide
List of liberal parties
Parti canadien - political party in Lower Canada, with similar ideological positions
Politics of Quebec

References

Additional references 
 "Parti rouge", in The Canadian Encyclopedia. Historica Foundation, 2008
 Claude Bélanger, "Parti Rouge", in The Quebec History Encyclopedia, 2006
 "The parti rouge", in Canadian Confederation, Library and Archives Canada, December 14, 2001, updated July 16, 2012

Additional French-language information sources
 Lamonde, Yvan (2000). , Montréal: , 576 p.  (online)
 Lamonde, Yvan (1994). , Saint-Laurent: Fides, 369 p. 
 Lamonde, Yvan (1990). , Montréal: Boréal, 176 p. 
 de Lagrave, Jean-Paul (1976). , Montréal: Editions de Lagrave, 150 p.
 Bernard, Jean-Paul (1971). , Montréal: Presses de l'Université du Québec, 394 p. 
 Dumont, Fernand, Montminy, Jean-Paul, and Hamelin, Jean ed. (1971). , Québec: Presses de l'Université Laval, 327 p.

Political parties in Lower Canada
Canada 1848
Political parties established in 1848
Radical parties
Liberal parties in Canada